Sharon Marie Stouder (November 9, 1948 – June 23, 2013), also known by her married name Sharon Stouder Clark, was an American competition swimmer, three-time Olympic champion, and former world record-holder in four events.

As a 15-year-old, she won three gold medals and one silver at the 1964 Summer Olympics in Tokyo, Japan.  She won the women's 100-meter butterfly, and was a member of the winning U.S. teams in the women's 4×100-meter freestyle relay and the women's 4×100-meter medley relay.  She also took second place in the women's 100-meter freestyle, finishing behind Australian Dawn Fraser, for a total of four medals.

Stouder swam sprint butterfly and sprint freestyle.  She was the second woman in history to go under the one-minute barrier in the 100-meter freestyle, the event she got her silver medal in at the 1964 Olympics.  In 1964 she twice broke the world record in the women's 200-meter butterfly.

She was inducted into the International Swimming Hall of Fame in 1972.  Stouder died June 23, 2013; she was 64 years old.

See also
 List of members of the International Swimming Hall of Fame
 List of multiple Olympic gold medalists
 List of Olympic medalists in swimming (women)
 List of Stanford University people
 World record progression 100 metres butterfly
 World record progression 200 metres butterfly
 World record progression 4 × 100 metres freestyle relay
 World record progression 4 × 100 metres medley relay

References

External links
 
 
 Image of U.S. Olympic swimmers Cathy Ferguson, Sharon Stouder and Claudia Kolb at LA Swim Stadium, California, 1964. Los Angeles Times Photographic Archive (Collection 1429). UCLA Library Special Collections, Charles E. Young Research Library, University of California, Los Angeles.

1948 births
2013 deaths
American female freestyle swimmers
American female butterfly swimmers
World record setters in swimming
Olympic gold medalists for the United States in swimming
Stanford University alumni
Swimmers at the 1963 Pan American Games
Swimmers at the 1964 Summer Olympics
Medalists at the 1964 Summer Olympics
Pan American Games gold medalists for the United States
Pan American Games medalists in swimming
Medalists at the 1963 Pan American Games
21st-century American women